Adis Bećiragić (Turkish: Aziz Bekir; born 18 June 1970) is a Bosnian-Turkish professional basketball coach and former player. He was a backbone player on the Bosnian national basketball team in the 1990s. Bećiragić ended his playing career in 2000, and has worked as a basketball coach since 2011. He was head coach of Torku Konyaspor between 2013 and 2016, and was head coach for Uşak Sportif from 2017 to 2018.

References

External links 
 TBLStat.net Profile
 Profile at eurobasket.com

1970 births
Living people
Basketball players from Sarajevo
Bosnia and Herzegovina emigrants to Turkey
Bosnia and Herzegovina basketball coaches
Bosnia and Herzegovina men's basketball players
Bosniaks of Bosnia and Herzegovina
Darüşşafaka Basketbol coaches
Gaziantep Basketbol coaches
KK Bosna Royal players
Türk Telekom B.K. players
Turkish basketball coaches
Turkish men's basketball players
Turkish people of Bosnia and Herzegovina descent
Ülker G.S.K. basketball players